Hillcrest High School is a four-year public high school located in the neighborhood of Jamaica Hills, Queens. The school is operated by the New York City Department of Education.

As of the 2014–15 school year, the school had an enrollment of 3,289 students and 149.2 classroom teachers (on an FTE basis), for a student–teacher ratio of 22.0:1. There were 2,380 students (72.4% of enrollment) eligible for free lunch and 311 (9.5% of students) eligible for reduced-cost lunch.

The mascot is the hawk (changed from the Braves, the original mascot chosen when the school opened in 1971) and the school colors are violet and gray.

The school's boys and girls' soccer team became division champions in the 06/07 and also the 07/08 season guided by Coach Asqui and captain Joao Azevedo. The school is also notable for its rigorous baseball program led by Coach Malave.

Stephen M. Duch was the school principal from 1996 to the beginning of 2014. In 2002 the school was listed as the most violent high school in the city. After his retirement, David T. Morrison, a graduate of Hillcrest and who served as the AP of English for several years, became the new principal.

Notable alumni 
This is a partial list of notable alumni of Hillcrest High School.
 Fran Drescher (Class of 1975), actress, best known for her role on The Nanny. While there she was told to get voice lessons. Her character Fran Fine from The Nanny also graduated from Hillcrest.
 Nina Foxx (Class of 1982), award-winning author, playwright filmmaker, Nina is also a leading female technologist, having worked in Human-Computer Interaction for several major tech companies, best known for NAACP Image Award-nominated novel Momma: Gone' 
 Bianca Golden (Class of 2006), model, best known for America's Next Top Model (Cycle 9)
Sherrilyn Ifill (Class of 1980), President and director-counsel of the NAACP Legal Defense Fund  
 Ray Romano (Class of 1975), actor, best known for his role as Ray Barone in Everybody Loves Raymond'' and Manny in all five of the Ice Age movies.

References 
Notes

Further reading
 Hillcrest High School gets Undeserved Grade on 2007 Progress Report  published by the NY Daily News (November 27, 2007)
 Two Hillcrest High Students Caught Setting Fires At School, Queens Chronicle (April 28, 2005)
 Public Advocate's Newsday Op-Ed on School Safety, Public Advocate for The City of New York (April 5, 2005)
 Principal Apple of His Eye, New York Daily news reprint (January 7, 2004)

External links

 Hillcrest High School website
 Hillcrest High School report card published by the New York State Education Department (NYSED)
 Hillcrest Highschool's library website

Public high schools in Queens, New York
Jamaica, Queens